Deccania is a monotypic genus of flowering plants in the family Rubiaceae. The genus contains only one species, viz. Deccania pubescens, which is endemic to India.

References

External links 
 Deccania in the World Checklist of Rubiaceae

Monotypic Rubiaceae genera
Gardenieae